Alexander Aciman (born 1990) is an American writer and journalist. His work has appeared in Tablet Magazine, The New York Times, Vox, The New Republic, The New Yorker online, Time magazine, and The Paris Review online. He is a graduate of The University of Chicago, and when he was a freshman co-authored Twitterature: The World's Greatest Books in Twenty Tweets or Less, published by Penguin Classics.

Early life
Aciman is the son of writer André Aciman and Susan Wiviott, a non-profit executive. He has two brothers, Philip and Michael, who are twins. Aciman is a graduate of The University of Chicago.

Personal life
As of 2018, Aciman lives in New York. He is fluent in French.

References

1990 births
Living people
American magazine journalists
American male non-fiction writers
Jewish American writers
Journalists from New York City
The New Yorker people
Time (magazine) people
University of Chicago alumni
21st-century American journalists
21st-century American male writers
American people of Italian-Jewish descent
American people of Turkish-Jewish descent
21st-century American Jews